Local elections will be held four municipalities in the north of Kosovo on 23 April 2023. They were initially scheduled to be held in December 2022 but were subsequently postoned. The elections will be held in the four Serb-majority municipalities of Leposavić, North Mitrovica, Zubin Potok and Zvečan, located in North Kosovo. The elections will be boycotted by the biggest Serb political party in Kosovo, the Serb List, following its departure from Kosovan institutions and the resignation of their mayors in North Kosovo in November. Among the declared candidates, there were only two from the Serb community. Aleksandar Arsenijević, candidate for mayor of the municipality of North Mitrovica withdrew his candidacy on 2 December. Only the Democratic Party of Kosovo (PDK) and Vetëvendosje (LVV) have mayoral candidates in all four municipalities. Kosovo President Vjosa Osmani had initially set 25 December as the polling date for the municipal assemblies of Zvečan and Leposavić in the north of Kosovo.

Results

Leposavić

North Mitrovica

Zubin Potok

Zvečan

References 

Kosovo
Local elections in Kosovo
Local
Kosovo